Hvězda zvaná Pelyněk (English: The Star Called Wormwood) is a 1964 Czech drama film written and directed by Martin Frič. It depicts the events of 1918 mutiny of Czech soldiers serving in the Austro-Hungarian army in Rumburk garrison.

Cast
 Jiřina Bohdalová as Tonka
 Radoslav Brzobohatý as Vodička
 Rudolf Deyl as Noha
 Jaroslav Mareš as Werner
 Vlasta Matulová as Hilda
 Míla Myslíková as Emka
 Čestmír Řanda as Klozberg
 Martin Růžek as Koval
 Jiří Sovák as Červenka
 Zdeněk Štěpánek as General
 Jan Tříska as Lojzík
 Josef Větrovec as Pelnar

References

External links
 

1964 films
1964 drama films
Czech drama films
1960s Czech-language films
Czechoslovak black-and-white films
Films directed by Martin Frič
1960s Czech films